Joseph Samson may refer to:

Joseph-Octave Samson (1862–1945), Canadian politician, served as Mayor of Quebec City 1920–1926
Joseph Samson (Lower Canada politician) (1771–1843), businessman and political figure in Lower Canada
Joseph Samson (composer) (1888–1957), French church composer and choirmaster
Joseph Isidore Samson (1793–1871), French actor and playwright